The Parachilna Gorge is a gorge on the western side of the Flinders Ranges in South Australia. Parachilna Creek flows through the gorge. Parachilna Gorge Road runs from Parachilna on the plains up through the gorge to Blinman. Angorichina Village is near the road at the eastern end of the gorge.

References

Canyons and gorges of Australia
Flinders Ranges
Far North (South Australia)